Nantou is a town situated at the northern periphery of the city of Zhongshan, Guangdong province. The population of Nantou has 130,712 residents.

Transportation
Nantou is served by Nantou railway station on the Guangzhou–Zhuhai intercity railway as well as Guangdong Provincial Expressway 43 (S43).

See also
Shatian dialect

External links
Nantou Government Website

Zhongshan
Township-level divisions of Guangdong